U.S. Route 41 (US 41) is a United States Numbered Highway that runs from Miami, Florida, to Copper Harbor, Michigan. In Tennessee, the highway is paralleled by Interstate 24 all the way from Georgia to Kentucky, and I-24 has largely supplanted US-41 as a major highway, especially for large and heavy vehicles, such as tractor-trailer trucks and buses.

Route description
US 41, joined by US 76, enters Tennessee east of I-75 on the outskirts of East Ridge. It is called "Ringgold Road" through East Ridge up to the Bachman Tunnel, where it enters Chattanooga. In Chattanooga, US 41 and US 76 becomes Westside Drive up to the intersection with Dodds Avenue, where for a short distance it is coexistent with Dodds Avenue. Then US 41 and US 76 becomes East Main Street in downtown Chattanooga up to the intersection with Broad Street (US 11 and US 64). At that point US 76 terminates, US 72 begins, and the now-conjoined US 41 and US 72 merges with US 11 and US 64, trekking southwestward around the base of Lookout Mountain into the Tiftonia community. Just west of Tiftonia, US 11 splits off, and it veers southwestward into Georgia.  US 41, US 64, and US 72 take a westward path from Hamilton County into Marion County.  US 41 breaks off from US 64 and US 72 at Jasper and joins with unsigned SR 150 before ascending the Cumberland Plateau. US 41 leaves SR 150 and joins with SR 56 at Tracy City and runs southwest into Monteagle. In Monteagle, US 41 descends toward Manchester, with US 41A breaking off toward Franklin County, travelling through Winchester, Tullahoma, Shelbyville, and other small communities before becoming merging with US 31A and becoming Nolensville Pike in Nashville.

After reaching Monteagle, US 41, included as part of the older Dixie Highway, continues northwest into Pelham, in Grundy County, then runs closely parallel with I-24 into Coffee County, going through Hillsboro, Manchester (where the road is also named Hillsboro Blvd) and Beechgrove, before entering Rutherford County.  From there, the highway continues diagonally through Murfreesboro (where the road is also named Broad St.), where the Dixie Highway joins up with US 70S.  The Stones River National Battlefield is located very near US 41 and US 70S on the northwest side, standing as a monument of the Battle of Stones River which took place during the American Civil War. US 41/70S continues northwest through Smyrna, and La Vergne before reaching Davidson County. The road passes through Antioch, before reaching Nashville, where US 41 separates from US 70S. US 41 goes through Nashville as Murfreesboro Rd, then Dickerson Pike, and comes out on the northeast side of the city joined with US 31W. US 41 continues northeast through Goodlettsville before breaking away from US 31W. US 41 then goes northwest and continues on into Robertson County, going through Springfield before heading west/northwest to the Kentucky border. Just before reaching Kentucky, US 41 briefly runs through Montgomery County.

Major intersections

State Route 150

State Route 150 (SR 150) is a  unsigned companion route for US 41 between Jasper and Tracy City. SR 150 was originally signed along its route while US 41 followed what is now I-24, and the original Dixie Highway, over Monteagle Mountain. When I-24 was routed over the mountain, TDOT rerouted US 41 over SR 150, and removed SR 150 signage at that time except for mile markers, which still remain to this day.

References

External links

 

41
 Tennessee
Transportation in Hamilton County, Tennessee
Transportation in Chattanooga, Tennessee
Transportation in Marion County, Tennessee
Transportation in Grundy County, Tennessee
Transportation in Coffee County, Tennessee
Transportation in Rutherford County, Tennessee
Transportation in Davidson County, Tennessee
Transportation in Nashville, Tennessee
Transportation in Sumner County, Tennessee
Transportation in Robertson County, Tennessee
Transportation in Montgomery County, Tennessee